Jeldeh Bakhan (also Romanized as Jeldeh Bākhān, Jaldeh Bākhān, and Jeldah Bākhān; also known as Jaldo Bakhan) is a village in Molla Yaqub Rural District, in the Central District of Sarab County, East Azerbaijan Province, Iran. At the 2006 census, its population was 784, in 161 families.

References 

Populated places in Sarab County